WPJK (1580 AM) is a radio station broadcasting a sports format. It is licensed to Orangeburg, South Carolina, United States, and is owned by South Carolina State University.

On April 17, 2017, WPJK filed an application with the Federal Communications Commission to transfer the license from Ermma Barton Gowdy to South Carolina State University.

On April 8, 2017, an application was filed for a construction permit to move to a new transmitter site, increase day power to 3,300 watts and add night authorization of 22 watts. The application was accepted for filing on April 18, 2017.

The purchase by South Carolina State was consummated on August 19, 2017.

On September 12, 2021, WPJK relaunched as "ESPN Orangeburg" with programming from ESPN Radio, and serving as the Orangeburg affiliate for WQXL Sports Talk from Columbia.

Call letter history
The station went on the air as WBPD in 1959. The call letters were changed to WORG on May 14, 1984. On September 9, 1985 the station changed its call sign to WBLO, and on February 17, 1986 to the current WPJK.

References

External links

PJK
Radio stations established in 1959
PJK
South Carolina State University
Sports radio stations in the United States
ESPN Radio stations